Deh Now-e Gudsar (also Romanized as Deh Now-e Gūdsar) is a village in Barez Rural District, Manj District, Lordegan County, Chaharmahal and Bakhtiari Province, Iran. At the 2006 census, its population was 47, in 6 families.

References 

Populated places in Lordegan County